John Newport Langley  (2 November 1852 – 5 November 1925) was a British physiologist, who made substantive discoveries about the nervous system and secretion.

Life
He was born in Newbury, Berkshire the son of John Langley, the local schoolmaster, and his wife, Mary Groom. He was educated at Exeter Grammar School in Devon. In 1871 he won a place at St John's College, Cambridge, where he graduated MA before continuing multiple postgraduate studies, gaining several doctorates. 

He spent his entire career at Cambridge University, beginning as a Demonstrator in lectures in 1875. He began lecturing in Physiology in 1884 and was awarded a professorship in 1903, succeeding Prof Michael Foster.

He was elected a Fellow of the Royal Society in 1883 and later its vice-president. He was made an Honorary Fellow of the Royal Society of Edinburgh in 1916.

Langley is known as one of the fathers of the chemical receptor theory, and as the origin of the concept of "receptive substance".

In 1901, he advanced research in neurotransmitters and chemical receptors, working with extracts from adrenal glands. These extracts elicited responses in tissues that were similar to those induced by nerve stimulation.

He coined the term "autonomic nervous system" (ANS) in 1898.

He was the first person who put forward the concept of parasympathetic nervous system as a division of the ANS in 1921.

He died in Cambridge on 5 November 1925, aged 73.

Publications
The Autonomic Nervous System (1921)
Elementary Experimental Physiology

Recognition
A brass plaque to Langley's memory exists in Trinity College Chapel at Cambridge University.

Family
Langley married at St. Mary′s church, Montrose, on 10 September 1902 Vera Kathleen Forsythe-Grant (d.1932), third daughter of Frederick Grant Forsyth-Grant, of Ecclesgreig, Kincardineshire.

References

Bibliography

Katz, B. (1986). "Archibald Vivian Hill", Dictionary of National Biography, Oxford University Press, Oxford, p. 406

1852 births
1925 deaths
Royal Medal winners
Fellows of the Royal Society
British physiologists
People from Newbury, Berkshire
Professors of Physiology (Cambridge)
Alumni of St John's College, Cambridge
The Journal of Physiology editors
Members of the Royal Society of Sciences in Uppsala